Aleksandr Vladimirovich Gutsan (Russian: Александр Владимирович Гуцан; born 6 July 1960) is a Russian lawyer and statesman. He was the Deputy Prosecutor General of the Russia from 13 April 2007 to 7 November 2018. He is currently the Plenipotentiary Representative of the President of the Russian Federation in the North-Western Federal District from 7 November 2018. He is also the member of the Security Council of the Russian Federation from 19 November 2018.

References

1960 births
Living people

Russian individuals subject to the U.S. Department of the Treasury sanctions